Hirtopelta hirta is a species of sea snail, a marine gastropod mollusk in the family Peltospiridae.

Description
The length of the shell attains 11.5 mm.

Distribution
It has been found living on the East Pacific Rise and the shells grow up to 12mm.

References

 McLean, J.H., 1989. New slit-limpets (Scissurellacea and Fissurellacea) from hydrothermal Vents. Part I. Systematic description and comparisons based on shell and radular characters. Contributions in Science 407: 1-29
 Warén A. & Bouchet P. (1993) New records, species, genera, and a new family of gastropods from hydrothermal vents and hydrocarbon seeps. Zoologica Scripta 22: 1-90

External links
 Warén A. & Bouchet P. (2001). Gastropoda and Monoplacophora from hydrothermal vents and seeps new taxa and records. The Veliger, 44(2): 116-231

Peltospiridae
Gastropods described in 1989